Ingomar Sieghart (born 10 September 1943) is a German athlete. He competed in the men's high jump at the 1968 Summer Olympics and the 1972 Summer Olympics.

References

1943 births
Living people
Athletes (track and field) at the 1968 Summer Olympics
Athletes (track and field) at the 1972 Summer Olympics
German male high jumpers
Olympic athletes of West Germany
Sportspeople from Ostrava